Stefania Krupa (14 December 1909 – 24 September 1981) was a Polish gymnast. She competed in the women's artistic team all-around event at the 1936 Summer Olympics.

References

1909 births
1981 deaths
Polish female artistic gymnasts
Olympic gymnasts of Poland
Gymnasts at the 1936 Summer Olympics
Gymnasts from Warsaw
20th-century Polish women